The ETAP 28i is a Belgian sailboat that was designed by French designers Philippe Harlé and Alain Mortain (Harlé-Mortain), as a cruiser and first built in 1988.

Production
The design was built by ETAP Yachting in Belgium from 1988 to 1997 with about 450 boats completed, but it is now out of production.

Design
The ETAP 28i is a recreational keelboat, built predominantly of polyester glassfibre-foam cored sandwich, with wood trim. It has a 7/8 fractional sloop rig with aluminum spars, a deck-stepped mast, wire standing rigging and a single set of swept spreaders. The hull has a raked stem, a reverse transom, an internally mounted spade-type rudder controlled by a tiller and a fixed fin keel, with a lifting keel optional. It displaces  and carries  of cast iron ballast.

The foam-cored construction renders the boat unsinkable.

The design has sleeping accommodation for six people, with a double "V"-berth in the bow cabin, two straight settee quarter berths in the main cabin and an aft cabin with a double berth on the port side. The galley is located on the port side just forward of the companionway ladder. The galley is "L"-shaped and is equipped with a two-burner stove, an ice box and a sink. The head is located just forward of the aft cabin on the starboard side and includes a hanging locker.

Operational history
The boat was at one time supported by a class club, the ETAP Owners Association.

In a 2009 Yachting Monthly review stated, "with a generously roached, fully-battened mainsail and working jib set on a sporty, 7/8 fractional rig and a fixed, deep-fin keel, she is a sharp performer, enjoyable to sail, good for short-handed cruising and ideal for a couple with two children. Some buyers
opted for a lifting keel, which slightly blunts her performance but she still sails well. The main cabin and forepeak are open-plan, under a semi-flush deck, with good headroom up to the forecabin, which is curtained off from the saloon. There is a large aft cabin, a good galley, a spacious heads abaft the companionway and a reasonable chart table."

See also
List of sailing boat types

References

Keelboats
1980s sailboat type designs
Sailing yachts
Sailboat type designs by Philippe Harlé
Sailboat type designs by Alain Mortain
Sailboat types built by ETAP Yachting